191 A.D. is a year.

191 may also refer to:
 191 BC
 191 (number)
 Jordan 191
 VF-191

See also
Flight 191 (disambiguation)
List of highways numbered 191